The World Federation Autistic Day Care Centre in Dar es Salaam, Tanzania was officially opened on 19 February 2006 by the President of The World Federation of KSIMC Dr Ahmed Hassam.

It will provide diagnosis treatment and rehabilitation for children with disabilities, including those with autism and chronic conditions.

References 

Special schools in Tanzania
2006 establishments in Tanzania